Lucia Hou is an Australia philanthropist,  photographer, media manager, and a winner of several beauty queen titles, she featured in over 50 magazines and news articles and she was awarded the 2018 Woman of Year internationally by World Class Beauty Queen for her philanthropy work around the world. Hou made the front cover of Influential people magazine as top 10 Influential woman of the year 2018.

Early years 
Hou, the youngest of 11 children, was born in Laos in 1976 and came to Australia at one year of age, she has two children. Hou told Herald Sun she got involved with charities to be a good role model for her children and to leave a legacy. Hou and her family escaped during the war in Laos across the Mekong river whilst soldiers guarded the banks settling in Australia.

Philanthropy 
Hou has worked with many charities and not for profit organizations such as;
 Charity Partner of Bully Zero Australia
 partner of the Australian Teenage Expo
 Partner of Sonya and Sacha Show. 
 Project Karma Ambassador
 The Victorian Cultural Association Inc.
 The Holi Festival
 Indian Film Festival of Melbourne
 Heart Kids Australia
 Women In Need Foundation
 Western Health Foundation
 CDF Transport Charity
 Scleroderma Australia
 Anti Poverty Week
 Hou has been appointed as of 2019 multicultural ambassador for Mental Health Foundation Australia (MHFA).

Professions 
Hou runs a building and maintenance company as well as being a professional photographer she is a trained painter and plasterer.

Awards 
 Mrs Coral Sea Globe 2016
 Mrs Oceana Globe 2017
 World Class Beauty Queens 2018 Woman of the year

References

External links
 

1976 births
Living people
Australian philanthropists
Australian beauty pageant winners
Australian female martial artists
Australian Wing Chun practitioners